The women's 55 kg (121 lbs) Light-Contact category at the W.A.K.O. World Championships 2007 in Belgrade was the lightest of the female Light-Contact tournaments falling between featherweight and lightweight when compared to Low-Kick and K-1 weight classes.  There were fourteen women taking part in the competition, all based in Europe.  Each of the matches was three rounds of two minutes each and were fought under Light-Contact rules.   

Due to the number of fighters unsuitable for a tournament designed for sixteen, two of the contestants had byes through to the quarter final stage.  The winner of the tournament was Russia's Maria Kushtanova who won by abandonment as her Hungarian opponent Monika Molnar had to give up due to an injury in their final match.  For reaching the semi finals Swiss Petra Battig and Ukrainian Kateryna Solovey claimed bronze medals.

Results

Key

See also
List of WAKO Amateur World Championships
List of WAKO Amateur European Championships
List of kickboxers

References

External links
 WAKO World Association of Kickboxing Organizations Official Site

Kickboxing events at the WAKO World Championships 2007 Belgrade
2007 in kickboxing
Kickboxing in Serbia